Nanula tasmanica is a species of sea snail, a marine gastropod mollusk in the family Trochidae, the top snails

Description
The height of the shell attains 6 mm, its diameter 5.5 mm. The small, rather thin, perforate shell has a globose-turbinate shape. It is lusterless, whitish, tinged with yellow or greenish, unicolored or marked with a few angular radiating maculations of blackish-brown. The spire is very short. The sutures are impressed. The about 4½ whorls are convex, rounded, all over finely regularly spirally lirulate. The body whorl is rounded at the periphery, or very bluntly subangular. It is convex beneath and impressed around the umbilicus. The aperture is quite oblique, rounded-ovate, angular above, broadly rounded below, with a thin iridescent layer of nacre within. The outer, basal and columellar margins are rather thin, curved, the latter joined to the upper margin by a thin white parietal callous. The narrow umbilicus is not bounded by an angle.

This dull whitish little shell may be known by its finely striate surface, narrow umbilicus, short spire and globose-turbinate form.

Distribution
This marine species is endemic to Australia and occurs in the shallow subtidal zone off Tasmania, Victoria and in the Bass Strait.

References

 Petterd, W. 1879. New species of Tasmanian marine shells. Journal of Conchology 2: 102–105 
 May, W.L. 1923. An Illustrated Index of Tasmanian Shells. Hobart : Government Printer 100 pp.

External links
 

tasmanica
Gastropods of Australia
Gastropods described in 1879